Protea simplex, the dwarf grassveld sugarbush, is a flower-bearing shrub belonging to the genus Protea. It is native to South Africa.

Description
The plant is small, flattened, and grows  in diameter. It flowers from December to March. The plant sprouts again after it has burned. The seeds are stored in a shell, released after 9-12 months and spread by the wind. The plant is unisexual. Pollination takes place through the action of birds.

Distribution and habitat
The plant occurs on the escarpment of the Drakensberg from Mariepskop through Mpumalanga and Eswatini to Vryheid in KwaZulu-Natal.

References

 http://redlist.sanbi.org/species.php?species=799-133
 https://www.proteaatlas.org.za/sugar11.htm
 http://biodiversityexplorer.info/plants/proteaceae/protea.htm

simplex
Flora of Southern Africa